is a railway station on the Rikuu East Line in the city of Ōsaki, Miyagi Prefecture, Japan, operated by East Japan Railway Company (JR East).

Lines
Nakayamadaira-Onsen Station is served by the Rikuu East Line, and is located 50.0 kilometers from the starting point of the line at Kogota Station.

Station layout
Nakayamadaira-Onsen Station has one  side platform, serving a single bi-directional track. The platform was originally an island platform, but there are no longer any tracks on one side. The station is unattended.

History
The station opened on 1 November 1917, named simply . The station was absorbed into the JR East network upon the privatization of JNR on 1 April 1987. The station was renamed Nakayamadaira-Onsen Station on 22 March 1997.

Surrounding area
National Route 47
Nakayamadaira Onsen

See also
 List of Railway Stations in Japan

References

External links

  

Railway stations in Miyagi Prefecture
Rikuu East Line
Railway stations in Japan opened in 1917
Ōsaki, Miyagi
Stations of East Japan Railway Company